Cottrell Key is an island in the Florida Keys in Monroe County, Florida, United States. It is within the boundaries of the Key West National Wildlife Refuge.

Located in the Outlying Islands of the Florida Keys, it is the northernmost of the Mule Keys that are 9 miles (15 km) west of Key West.

It is named for Captain Jeremiah Cottrell, who was the captain of a lightship that was anchored at the key in the early 19th century.

References

Islands of the Florida Keys
Islands of Monroe County, Florida
Islands of Florida